Chamalychaeus yanoshigehumii is a species of tropical land snail with an operculum, a terrestrial gastropod mollusks in the family Cyclophoridae.

This species is endemic to Japan.

References

Molluscs of Japan
Chamalychaeus
Gastropods described in 1987
Taxonomy articles created by Polbot